Petone FC is an  association football club in Petone, New Zealand. The club provides football for men, women and children. The club's men's first team competes in the Central League with the women's first team competing in the Capital Football W-League. The club is based at Memorial Park in the Lower Hutt suburb of Petone.

History and achievements
The club is the successor for Petone United, a club founded in 1889 as Petone Wanderers before merging with the Wellington Rowing Club in 1892, competing under the name United until disbandment in 1895.

The club has won the Chatham Cup three times (1928, 1930, and 1949) and won the Central League title in 1990.

Petone FC was originally known at Petone Association Football Club, however the club was renamed Petone Soccer Club in 1994. In 2009, club management voted to rename the club as Petone Football Club.

Major Honours
 Central League Winners 1990
 Capital Premier in 2006, 2007 and 2019
 Chatham Cup Winners 1928, 1930 and 1949.

References

External links
Official Website
Capital Football profile
Ultimatenzsoccer profile

Association football clubs in Wellington
Association football clubs established in 1898
Sport in Lower Hutt
1890s establishments in New Zealand